Swarup Dutta (22 June 1941 – 24 July 2019)  was a Bengali actor. His son Saron Dutta is a director in Bengali film industry.

Early life
Dutta was born in famous Dutta family of Hatkhola, Kolkata in 1941. In 1958 he passed Matriculation from the South Point School and completed I.A. from Ramakrishna Mission Vidyamandira. Dutta graduated in economics from St. Xavier's College, Kolkata.

Career
During his school days Dutta came into contact with veteran actor Utpal Dutt. He also performed with Utpal Dutt on stage. First breakthrough of his career is Apanjan, a popular drama film of Tapan Sinha released in 1968. This movie won the National Film Award. He played the role of hero and versatile parts in a number of Bengali films of the late 60s and early 70s. Dutta also acted in Hindi film Uphaar with Jaya Bhaduri in 1971. He died on 17 July 2019 at the age of 78 in a hospital of Kolkata.

Selected filmography
 Apanjan
 Megh o Roudra
 Sagina Mahato
 Uphaar
 Andha Atit
 Harmonium
 Ekhoni
 Sansarer Itikatha
 Bishabriksha
 Kony (film)
 Pita Putra
 Swarnasikhar Prangane
 Maa O Meye
 Paap Punya
 Ora Charjon
 Sadharan Meye

References

External links
 

1941 births
2019 deaths
Indian male film actors
Male actors in Bengali cinema
20th-century Indian male actors
Bengali male actors
Male actors from Kolkata
University of Calcutta alumni